The ADOX brand for photographic purposes has been used by three different companies since its original conception over one hundred fifty years ago. 
ADOX was originally a brand name used by the German company, Fotowerke Dr. C. Schleussner GmbH of Frankfurt am Main, the world's first photographic materials manufacturer. In 1962 the Schleussner family sold its photographic holdings to DuPont, an American company. DuPont used the brand for its subsidiary, Sterling Diagnostic Imaging for X-ray films. In 1999, Sterling was bought by the German company Agfa. Agfa did not use the brand and allowed its registration to lapse in 2003. Fotoimpex of Berlin, Germany, a company founded in 1992 to import photographic films and papers from former eastern Europe immediately registered the brand and today ADOX is a brand of black and white films, photographic papers and photochemistry produced by ADOX Fotowerke GmbH based in Bad Saarow near Berlin.

History

Fotowerke Dr. C. Schleussner GmbH (1860 - 1962)
ADOX was originally a brand name used by the German company, Fotowerke Dr. C. Schleussner GmbH of Frankfurt am Main, the world's first photographic materials manufacturer. The company's founder, Dr. Carl Schleussner, did pioneering work on the wet-collodion process during the early years of photography, and formed his manufacturing company in 1860. Working with the physicist Wilhelm Röntgen, discoverer of X-rays, Dr. Schleussner invented the first X-ray plate.

The Schleussner firm began marketing cameras under the ADOX brand name in the first third of the 20th century and, recognizing the growing importance of the brand, renamed itself "Adox Fotowerke Dr. C. Schleussner GmbH." In 1952 they introduced a line of very sharp black and white 35 mm films under the ADOX brand.

DuPont & Agfa (1962 - 2003)
In 1962, the Schleussner family sold its photographic holdings to DuPont, an American company. DuPont became owners of the trademark, and registered it in the United States.

In the 1970s, Dupont licensed the Adox film technology, but not the trademark, and sold the coating plant with 'dip and dunk' machinery of their film to Fotokemika, Samobor, Croatia (at the time Yugoslavia) in 1972 who continued to produce the traditional black and white films according to the 1950s ADOX formulas under the Efke brand. (See List of discontinued photographic films). In particular the slowest speed film KB 25 was laid down as a single layer emulsion. The films were low cost but due to their soft emulsion were prone to scratching during processing as well as quality issues.

DuPont kept the Adox trademark, transferring it to a subsidiary, Sterling Diagnostic Imaging, for its Adox brand X-ray films. DuPont still applies it to an industrial chemical, sodium chlorite.

In 1999, Sterling was bought by the German company Agfa, and was absorbed into Agfa's Health Sciences unit. In this roundabout way, the Adox photographic trademark once again briefly became German. Agfa did not use the Adox trademark, and the mark was removed from the German Patent Office trademark registry in March, 2003. It was almost immediately revived by companies in Canada, the United States, and Fotoimpex in Germany.

ADOX Fotowerke GmbH (2003 on)
The current rights to the ADOX name were obtained in 2003 by Fotoimpex of Berlin, Germany, a company founded in 1992 to import photographic films and papers from former eastern Europe. In particular they imported the Efke KB films and sold them branded as 'ADOX CHS Art' thus finally re-uniting the ADOX name with the original Schleussner film formula.

Fotoimpex established the ADOX Fotowerke GmbH film factory in Bad Saarow outside Berlin to convert and package their films, papers and chemicals using machinery acquired from the closed AGFA (Leverkusen, Germany) and Forte Photochemical Industry (Hungary) photographic plants.

ADOX test-produced a slightly improved version of the original AGFA APX 400 as ADOX Pan 400 during 2010.

After Fotokemikas closure in 2012 due to failure of the original film making machinery proving too expensive to repair, Fotoimpex had ADOX CHS II (100 ISO, equivalent to Efke KB 100) black and white film produced using modern cascade coating. This took priority over proposals to re-introduce Agfa APX 400.

In February 2015 they purchased/obtained a long lease on the former Ilford Imaging, Switzerland (Ciba Geigy) machine E, medium scale coating line at Marly, Switzerland to coat photographic film and paper. Trial coating for ADOX CHS (II) was undertaken at Marly prior to its re-introduction in 2018.  The plant has also been used for testing the proposed revival of Polywarmtone Paper last produced by Forte in Hungary.

ADOX are also (2017–19) doubling the size of the film factory in Bad Saarow, Germany to add a small coating line using a former AGFA machine as well as space for small scale chemical production and film materials storage.

Current Products
ADOX Fotowerke GmbH produces a range of black and white films, photographic paper and photochemistry. The company has notably resurrected former ADOX films and AGFA films, paper and chemicals including the entire Agfa B&W chemistry line with the help of its former employees and it now holds the trademark in Europe and USA for the famous (Agfa) Rodinal film developer. It also sells newer more 'eco-friendly products'. Chemistry is produced in house in their factory.

Films 
 CMS 20 II ISO 20 An Agfa-Gevaert ortho micro film converted by ADOX offering very high resolution, needing special developer to tame contrast for normal pictures. Format: 135, 120* 
 CHS II 100 ISO The original ADOX R/KB21 film (Efke KB100 to 2012) classic 1950s ortho-panchromatic B&W print film. Introduced 2013 as a modern coating on a polyester base, but sold out by 2016. It was not re-introduced until 2018, initially as sheet film.  Format: 135*, 120*, Sheet film.
 Silvermax 100 ISO panchromatic B&W print film on a triacetate base (Similar to the original Agfa APX 100). Format: 135
 SCALA 160 ISO panchromatic B&W reversal film (Same film as Silvermax) Format:135
HR-50 50 ISO Super-panchromatic ultra fine grain - Agfa-Gevaert Aviphot 80 modified to enhance usability. May also be used as an infra-red film with suitable filtration. Introduced 2018 Format: 135
IR-HR PRO 50 ISO 80. Super-panchromatic fine grain film - Agfa-Gevaert Aviphot 80 as HR-50 without modification. Initial trial batch introduced 2018. Format: 135

(*current unavailable)

Photographic Paper 
 MCC 110. Fibre based paper (As for Agfa Multicontrast Classic) emulsion made using original Agfa machinery.
 MCP 310. Premium Resin Coated photopaper with outstanding image quality (As for Agfa Multicontrast Classic) emulsion made using original Agfa machinery.
 Fine Print Variotone. A newly developed warmtone paper made in cooperation with Harman Technology and Wolfgang Moersch 
 Lupex. A slow speed contact fibre paper made with a silver chloride emulsion and replaces Kodak Azo or Fomalux.

Other Photographic Paper 
 Art Baryta. Pure uncoated baryta base for coating with liquid emulsions
 Fibre Baryta. Inkjet paper using fibre-base from analog photo paper manufacturing (100% alphacellulose with a barium-sulfate coating) and is coated with  an inkjet receiving layer plus a backside coating to minimize curling behavior.
 Fibre Monojet. An inkjet media optimized for the reproduction of black and white images.

Film Developers 
 RODINAL Liquid concentrate developer dating from 1891 and produced according to Agfa Leverkusen's latest Rodinal formula from 2004
 ATOMAL 49. Powder based Universal ultra-finegrain developer for all types of B/W materials with good speed utilisation and high compensating factor. (Development of Agfa Atomal with currently available chemistry)
 FX 39 II. Geoffry Crawleys FX-39 was a development of Willi Beutler's formula for Neofin Red.
 Silvermax Developer. Specially formulated to increase tonal range in the Silvermax 21 film, formulated by SPUR

Paper Developers 
 ADOTOL NE. Liquid concentrate Neutral black working paper developer. Former Agfa developer
 NEUTOL WA. Liquid concentrate warm tone paper developer. Former Agfa developer
 MCC Developer. Liquid concentrate fine art developer For Multigrade Papers for neutral-black image tones. Former Agfa developer
 NEUTOL ECO. Liquid concentrate without hydroquinine based on ascorbic acid.
 ADOTOL KONSTANT Powder developer, which produces a neutral-black image tone
 RA-4 Kit Liquid concentrate colour paper developer kit

Other Chemicals 
 ADOSTOP ECO (2018) Liquid concentrate 100% citric acid based odourless stop bath.
 Acetic Acid 60% Acetic acid liquid concentrate for stop baths. 
 ADOFIX Plus  Liquid concentrate, high capacity express-fixer with maximum capacity for black and white photo papers (RC and fibre), films and photographic plates.
 ADOFLO  Highly liquid concentrated wetting agent
 ADOSTAB  Liquid concentrate, image stabilizer and wetting agent. 
 SELENTONER  Selenium toner for black and white photomaterials (films or paper)

Discontinued Products

Produced by ADOX Fotowerke Dr. C. Schleussner GmbH.

Cameras 
135 format
 Adrette, name variant of the Wirgin Edinex
 Adox 300
 Adox 500, prototypes
 Golf I (1964)
 Golf IA
 Golf IIA
 Golf IIIA
 ADOX Polo
 Polo 1S
 Polomat
 Polomatic

6 x 6 Box
 ADOX 66
 Adox Blitz

6 x 6 Folding
 Golf I
 Golf II
 Golf IV
 Mess-Golf I
 Mess-Golf II
 Mess-Golf IV
 Golf 63 (1954–59)
 Golf 63 S
 Golf 45 S

6 x 9
 Adox Sport (6x9 + 6x4.5)
 Adox Start (1950)

Films 
 ADOX KB 14 / R14 (1952 -1973) Ortho-panchromatic B&W print film
 ADOX KB 17 / R17 (1952 -1973) Ortho-panchromatic B&W print film
 ADOX KB 21 / R21 (1952 -1973) Ortho-panchromatic B&W print film
 ADOX C15 (1958) Color reversal film
 ADOX C17 (?) Color reversal film

See also
List of photographic films
List of discontinued photographic films

References

Sources
''The text of this article has been adapted with permission from information published at

External links

 

Photographic film makers
Photography companies of Germany
German brands